S. sylvestre may refer to:
 Secale sylvestre, Host., a rye species in the genus Secale
 Syzygium sylvestre, a plant species endemic to Sri Lanka

See also
 Sylvestre (disambiguation)